Mohd Loqman Hakim bin Marzuki (born 22 January 1998) is a Malaysian professional footballer who plays as a defender for Kedah Darul Aman.

He is an alumnus of Sultan Abdul Hamid College.

Career statistics

Club

References

External links
 

1998 births
Living people
People from Kedah
Malaysian footballers
Association football defenders
Kedah Darul Aman F.C. players
Malaysia Super League players